This is a list of members of the Tasmanian House of Assembly between the 31 May 1919 election and the 10 June 1922 election. Nationalist MHA Walter Lee was the Premier of Tasmania throughout the term. In 1922, shortly before the election, a new Country Party emerged with several sitting Nationalist MPs joining it.

Notes
  Labor MHA for Wilmot, Joseph Lyons, resigned to contest the federal seat of Darwin at the 13 December 1919 election, and was unsuccessful. He was re-elected at the Wilmot by-election on 10 January 1920.
  Nationalist MHA for Darwin, Herbert Payne, resigned in January 1920 to contest a vacancy on the Australian Senate. Nationalist candidate Percy Pollard was elected on 29 January 1920.

Sources
 
 Parliament of Tasmania (2006). The Parliament of Tasmania from 1856

Members of Tasmanian parliaments by term
20th-century Australian politicians